Euchelus hummelincki is a species of sea snail, a marine gastropod mollusk in the family Chilodontidae.

Description
The height of the shell attains 3.2 mm.

Distribution
This marine species occurs in the West Indies off the Grenadines and Barbados; in the Atlantic Ocean off Brazil.

References

External links
 To Encyclopedia of Life
 To USNM Invertebrate Zoology Mollusca Collection
 To World Register of Marine Species
 

hummelincki
Molluscs described in 1989